Nicolaus Mameranus (6 December 1500 – 1567) was a Luxembourg soldier and historian under Charles V, for whom he travelled widely, recording faithfully the composition of foreign courts and the customs of foreign countries. All his writings are in Latin.  Mameranus was born in Mamer, probably as Nik Wagener. He was a Roman Catholic.

Mameranus succeeded in having Charles V pay for the restoration of his native Mamer after the Duke of Orléans' troops pillaged it in 1543. In 1555, Charles V appointed him poet laureate and Count Palatine in recognition of his continued support.

He probably died in Augsburg, Germany, in 1567.

References

Bibliography
 
 Alle 500 Jahre wieder - Article in German by Romain Hilgert at land.lu
  Catalogus omnium Generalium, Tribunorum Ducum, Primorumque totius Exercitus Caroli V Impr. Aug. et Ferdinandi Regis Roman., super rebelleis et inobedie nteis Germ. quosdam principes ac civitates conscripti anno 1546

Luxembourgian soldiers
Luxembourgian poets
16th-century Luxembourgian historians
1500 births
1567 deaths
People from Mamer